Battle of Delhi may refer to:

 Siege of Delhi, 1303, fought between the Mongol Chagatai Khanate and the Delhi Sultanate
 Battle of Delhi (1398), fought between the Timurids and the Tughlaq dynasty 
 Battle of Tughlaqabad (1556), also known as the Battle of Delhi, fought between the Mughals and Hemu
 Battle of Delhi (1737), fought between the Mughal Empire and Maratha Empire
 Battle of Delhi (1757), fought between the Maratha Empire and Rohilla Afghans
 Battle of Delhi (1764), fought between Bharatpur State and Mughal Empire
 Capture of Delhi (1771) fought between Marathas under Mahadji Shinde and Rohillas under Najib ad-Dawlah
 Battle of Delhi (1783), fought between the Sikhs and the Mughal Empire
 Battle of Delhi (1803), fought between the Maratha Empire and British East India Company
 Siege of Delhi (1804), fought between the Maratha Empire and British East India Company
 Siege of Delhi in 1857, a battle fought between British East India Company and Indian Rebels

See also 
 Battle of Karnal
 Second Battle of Panipat